Yarlaganda (fl. late 3rd millennium BCE) was the 17th Gutian ruler of the Gutian Dynasty of Sumer mentioned on the "Sumerian King List" (SKL). According to the SKL: Yarlaganda was the successor of Puzur-Suen. Si'um then succeeded Yarlaganda (likewise according to the SKL.).

See also

 History of Sumer
 List of Mesopotamian dynasties

References

Gutian dynasty of Sumer